Be There is a single by Howie Day from the album Sound the Alarm.

Charts
"Be There" debuted on the Billboard Adult Top 40 Songs at 38 for the week ending July 11, 2009.  The song peaked at #23 in its 18th week on the chart.

References

2009 singles
Howie Day songs
2009 songs
Songs written by Kevin Griffin
Song recordings produced by Warren Huart
Epic Records singles